The Venetian Causeway crosses Biscayne Bay between Miami on the mainland and Miami Beach on a barrier island in the Miami metropolitan area. The man-made Venetian Islands and non-bridge portions of the causeway were created by materials which came from the dredging of the bay.

The causeway has one toll plaza (administered by the Miami-Dade County Public Works department) on Biscayne Island, the westernmost Venetian Island. The toll for an automobile is $3.00 (US).

The causeway has two bascule bridges. At the Downtown/Western Beginning of the causeway travelers are greeted by two columns vertically saying "VENETIAN WAY" along with a sign indicating that there is a weight limit .

At the South Beach/Eastern Terminus, drivers must choose whether to go north onto Dade Boulevard or eastbound onto 17th Street to Ocean Drive, Collins Ave/A1A, Lincoln Road, City Hall, The Convention Center, Jackie Gleason Theater and the beach .

The Venetian Causeway was listed in the National Register of Historic Places in 1989. It was re-dedicated in 1999 after the completion of a $29 million restoration and replacement project.

In 2023 Miami-Dade County initiated a plan to replace the 11 original bridges along the causeway with higher structures.

A popular use of the causeway is for exercising, including both jogging and bicycling.

See also
 Belle Isle
 Collins Bridge
 Di Lido Island
 Biscayne Island
 Rivo Alto Island
 John S. Collins
 Carl G. Fisher

Gallery

References

External links

 New York Times Article (March 21, 2008): Islands of Calm 

Toll bridges in Florida
Roads in Miami
Roads in Miami Beach, Florida
Roads in Miami-Dade County, Florida
Causeways in Miami-Dade County, Florida
Intracoastal Waterway
Road bridges on the National Register of Historic Places in Florida
National Register of Historic Places in Miami-Dade County, Florida
Bridges completed in 1913
Drawbridges on the National Register of Historic Places
1913 establishments in Florida
Concrete bridges in the United States
Bascule bridges in the United States